The 9th constituency of Alpes-Maritimes is a French legislative constituency currently represented by Michèle Tabarot of The Republicans (LR).  It is located in the western part of the department, around the town of Grasse.

Historic Representation

Election results

2022

 
 
 
 
 

 
 
 
 * LREM dissident.

2017

2012

|- style="background-color:#E9E9E9;text-align:center;"
! colspan="2" rowspan="2" style="text-align:left;" | Candidate
! rowspan="2" colspan="2" style="text-align:left;" | Party
! colspan="2" | 1st round
! colspan="2" | 2nd round
|- style="background-color:#E9E9E9;text-align:center;"
! width="75" | Votes
! width="30" | %
! width="75" | Votes
! width="30" | %
|-
| style="background-color:" |
| style="text-align:left;" | Michèle Tabarot
| style="text-align:left;" | Union for a Popular Movement
| UMP
| 
| 47.32%
| 
| 61.32%
|-
| style="background-color:" |
| style="text-align:left;" | Marie-Louise Gourdon
| style="text-align:left;" | Socialist Party
| PS
| 
| 28.59%
| 
| 38.68%
|-
| style="background-color:" |
| style="text-align:left;" | Marlène Orfila
| style="text-align:left;" | National Front
| FN
| 
| 17.43%
| colspan="2" style="text-align:left;" |
|-
| style="background-color:" |
| style="text-align:left;" | Pierre Bernasconi
| style="text-align:left;" | Left Front
| FG
| 
| 3.99%
| colspan="2" style="text-align:left;" |
|-
| style="background-color:" |
| style="text-align:left;" | Pascal Ducreux
| style="text-align:left;" | Ecologist
| ECO
| 
| 1.41%
| colspan="2" style="text-align:left;" |
|-
| style="background-color:" |
| style="text-align:left;" | Haydée Muller
| style="text-align:left;" | Ecologist
| ECO
| 
| 0.78%
| colspan="2" style="text-align:left;" |
|-
| style="background-color:" |
| style="text-align:left;" | Robert Giardina
| style="text-align:left;" | Far Left
| EXG
| 
| 0.28%
| colspan="2" style="text-align:left;" |
|-
| style="background-color:" |
| style="text-align:left;" | Laurent de Vargas
| style="text-align:left;" | Other
| AUT
| 
| 0.21%
| colspan="2" style="text-align:left;" |
|-
| colspan="8" style="background-color:#E9E9E9;"|
|- style="font-weight:bold"
| colspan="4" style="text-align:left;" | Total
| 
| 100%
| 
| 100%
|-
| colspan="8" style="background-color:#E9E9E9;"|
|-
| colspan="4" style="text-align:left;" | Registered voters
| 
| style="background-color:#E9E9E9;"|
| 
| style="background-color:#E9E9E9;"|
|-
| colspan="4" style="text-align:left;" | Blank/Void ballots
| 
| 0.99%
| 
| 2.38%
|-
| colspan="4" style="text-align:left;" | Turnout
| 
| 56.97%
| 
| 52.62%
|-
| colspan="4" style="text-align:left;" | Abstentions
| 
| 43.03%
| 
| 47.38%
|-
| colspan="8" style="background-color:#E9E9E9;"|
|- style="font-weight:bold"
| colspan="6" style="text-align:left;" | Result
| colspan="2" style="background-color:" | UMP HOLD
|}

2007

2002

 
 
 
 
 
|-
| colspan="8" bgcolor="#E9E9E9"|
|-

1997

 
 
 
 
 
 
|-
| colspan="8" bgcolor="#E9E9E9"|
|-
 
 

 
 
 
 
 

*RPR dissident

References and sources
Results at the Ministry of the Interior (French)

9
Constituencies established in 1986